The Co-optation Mechanism of the Chinese Communist Party (CCP) is a phenomenon which was popularised since the  16th National Party Congress in 2002, at the time of the Jiang Zemin administration. The purpose of the co-optation mechanism is to integrate elites, such as entrepreneurs with skilled expertise, into the CCP. This mechanism is seen as an essential strategy to win the support of the economic and political elites, as well as essential for the party’s long-term survival and success in promoting economic modernisation.

The origins of the People’s Republic of China’s (PRC) transition to a more open and modern country dates back to the late-1970s, after the death of Mao Zedong. Economic reforms led by Deng Xiaoping in 1978 kickstarted the shift of the CCP from the traditional Maoism ideology towards a socialist market-oriented approach. These reforms have led to the opening up of both the state-owned and private economic sectors and have been imperative to advancing China’s stagnated economy. However, the Tiananmen Square protests in 1989 were a major setback to these economic reforms. In these protests, thousands of students called for greater freedom of speech, more economic freedom, and stricter curbs on corruption.

The Tiananmen Square incident was seen by many Chinese businessmen and women as a symbol of change - these protests have changed the way economic and political elites perceive themselves and their role in the political discourse. This serves as a reminder for the CCP that businesspeople have the potential to generate democratisation movements that may threaten the regime. As a result, the CCP banned businesspeople from joining the party, which led to a setback of the co-optation mechanism from the late 1980s to early 1990s.

After Deng’s death, economic reforms were maintained by his handpicked successors, which included Jiang Zemin. Jiang introduced the political theory of the Three Represents, which emphasises the role of the CCP to represent China’s advanced productive forces, the orientation of China’s advanced culture, and the fundamental interests of the overwhelming majority of the Chinese people. This political theory informs the CCP’s co-optation mechanism and shows the CCP’s desire to bring economic and political elites into the party because they have the skills party leaders need in order to accomplish their policy agenda of economic modernisation. The co-optation mechanism has been considered widely successful, which is reflected in the steady increase of businesspeople into CCP membership; from 13% of CCP members in 1993, to 20% in 1999, and then to 34% in 2004.

The co-optation mechanism is considered to be a successful attempt by the CCP to assure their regime’s survival. During Jiang Zemin’s term as General Secretary of the CCP, and subsequently under the Hu Jintao administration, there has been rapid economic growth in China, which scholars argue could partly be a result of the CCP’s adoption of the co-optation mechanism. From 1979 to 2018, China’s annual real GDP growth averaged 9.5%, compared to 6.7% from 1953 to 1978.

However, recently the co-optation mechanism has been retracted by the CCP. Since Xi Jinping took power in 2012, many elites and business owners have been under threat from the CCP’s reform spree, which includes the implementation of the anti-corruption campaign and strict guidelines on many technological companies. In other words, under Xi’s administration, the co-optation mechanism has been undermined, though it is still relevant towards understanding the CCP’s membership demographic.

Implementation 
The Chinese Communist Party (CCP) has utilised a dual approach in co-opting the business sector within its political control. This includes both entrepreneurs joining the Party as members and legislators, as well as the CCP itself forming organisations within private enterprises to oversee its internal actions. The CCP does this not only to prevent any sort of alternative power centre but to also glean important insight and support from business leaders in China. This model can be described as ‘state corporatism’, geared towards extending control as opposed to a need to balance interests.

Motivating the entrepreneurial class to be incorporated within the party is both self-interest and fear. By being a part of the CCP, the business community can benefit from state support. The state’s complete authority within the economy necessitates friendly relations to ensure smooth functioning of their economic interests. The CCP also uses its controlling levers to force business leaders and enterprises to follow the party line. After Jack Ma of Alibaba openly criticised state control of the banking sector at the Shanghai Bund Summit in October 2020, China’s market regulator announced the launch of an antitrust inquiry into Alibaba. This has repeated with the former chairman of the Anbang Insurance group, Wu Xiahao, who was sentenced to 18 years in prison for criticising the CCP. Ye Jianming of CEFC China Energy was also detained in 2014. These moves show the CCP’s capacity and incentive to target those critical of its regime.

Since the policy shift under Jiang Zemin, the PRC has been incorporating business leaders into the membership of the party. This creates “ties to wealthy and successful entrepreneurs”. Economic and political elites may serve in internal committees or even “serve as delegates in legislative congresses”, bringing their experience and expertise to strengthen CCP functioning and administration. Within the CCP, licensed associations for independent entrepreneurs have also been created, which coordinate actions between entrepreneurs and members of the CCP. New committees within the CCP have also been created to cater for a specific function that the Party requires. These groups are managed by “officials from the party” to ensure that entrepreneurs follow Party guidelines and do not stray from CCP ideology.

The CCP also creates branches within private enterprises to supervise their actions and ensure total authority. In March 2012, Xi Jinping issued an official document, directing the party to “comprehensively cover” private enterprise, in line with the 1993 Company Law of the People’s Republic of China that requires all companies to host CCP units within their administration. CCP penetration into the private sector has increased as China’s economy continues to grow, with “92% of China’s top 500 private enterprises” hosting party cells within their company. The CCP gives greater attention to these large firms, providing “full-time secretaries and party workers” that oversee company decisions and governance. These cells ensure that enterprises follow guidelines, laws, and regulations while also ensuring that their personnel are regularly taught Party positions and ideology.

Rationale 
As previously discussed, the CCP’s strategy to maintain regime stability includes the co-optation of economic and political elites. Bruce J. Dickson, a prominent scholar in academic research on political change in China, theorises two main reasons why the CCP has adopted this co-optation mechanism.

The first main reason, Dickson argues, is that entrepreneurs and the economic elite have benefitted the People's Republic of China (PRC) by creating new jobs, leading to greater prosperity across China. By co-opting Chinese businessmen and women into the CCP, the CCP by default becomes connected to the architects of China’s growing economy and thus linked to those who are needed to continue this economic growth. Dickson argues that China’s increasing prosperity is the “main source of the CCP’s contemporary claim to legitimate rule”, and therefore, it is through maintaining this increase in prosperity that the CCP can ensure its own survival. In other words, the co-optation of the economic elite is necessary to promote economic modernisation and increasing prosperity, which fuels the CCP’s political legitimacy.

The second main reason is that by co-opting economic elites into the CCP, the party can “pre-empt efforts by these new elites either to form their own groups in opposition to the Party or to align with other regime opponents”. The CCP were concerned that if the economic elites continued to be excluded from the CCP, they might organise against the party, with their growing economic power and resources translating into significant political clout.

Shabrina and Winarsih (2016) argue a third reason for the CCP’s adoption of the co-optation mechanism – the CCP’s desire for party leadership and membership to represent the large majority of Chinese people. As China’s middle class began to grow exponentially at the start of the 21st century, the CCP determined it was important not to exclude or marginalise this growing social class from CCP activities and instead decided to involve economic elites in various political processes. The CCP’s desire to represent the interests of the majority of Chinese people (or at least to be seen to do this) is shown through Jiang Zemin’s “Three Represents'' slogan; a redefinition of the CCP’s relationship with Chinese society in which the Party claims to represent not only the proletariat, but also society’s “advanced productive forces”, which is referring to “the growing urban middle class of businesspeople, professionals, and high-tech specialists”.

Problems with the Mechanism 
The introduction of the co-optation mechanism to the CCP has created division within the party over whether this represented a break away from the party's ideology. Opponents of co-optation have argued that the inclusion of entrepreneurs within the party represents the interests of private capital triumphing over those of the working class, otherwise known as the proletariat. By allowing those who exploit the proletariat to enter the Party, the CCP is breaking from its traditions in favour of private enterprises and wealth accumulation.  The critics of the co-optation mechanism tended to be the more orthodox Marxist members of the CCP. Their vocal and public criticism of Zemin’s support for co-optation resulted in his banning of Marxist newspapers within the PRC. These critics believed that not only was co-optation at odds with the ideology of the CCP but that it would begin to transform Chinese Society away from its traditional values and could result in the eventual collapse of the regime. This belief that co-optation would ultimately result in the destruction of the party is closely tied to the modernisation theory, which states that as a nation develops, it will tend towards democratisation. While this has not yet occurred in China, the issue of co-optation remains contentious within the CCP and ultimately in 2021, Xi Jinping vowed to curb the excessive wealth of these entrepreneurs as a response to growing discontent within the party regarding these economic elites.

The co-optation of private enterprises into the CCP has allowed for massive economic growth within the country, with many CEOs of these enterprises generating vast amounts of wealth. The role of entrepreneurs within China is rapidly changing and many of its richest citizens are attempting to leave the country with their wealth. This is a direct result of Xi Jinping’s decision to restrict the excess wealth of these individuals, with many being pressured into donating billions to social causes like low-income housing. Those who have fallen afoul of the state, often due to corruption and refusal to pay taxes, face lengthy prison sentences or steep fines. This, coupled with the effects of COVID-19 lockdowns in China, has led to a massive drop in the wealth of entrepreneurs and many are looking to flee the country, taking large parts of the Chinese economy along with them. Under Xi Jinping, the CCP has begun to move away from the co-optation mechanism it has previously employed, instead beginning to favour an approach that aims to promote common prosperity throughout China.

References 

Politics articles needing expert attention